Shah Heydar (also Romanized as Shāh Ḩeydar) is a village in Minjavan-e Sharqi Rural District, Minjavan District, Khoda Afarin County, East Azerbaijan Province, Iran. At the 2006 census, its population was 121, in 34 families.

References 

Populated places in Khoda Afarin County